Francis Rosslyn Courtenay Bruce (14 August 1871 – 19 January 1956) was an English Anglican priest, naturalist and writer.

Biography
Bruce was the grandson of Sir James Bruce, 2nd Baronet who fought at Waterloo; son of Lloyd Stuart Bruce, a canon of York Minster from 1873 to 1876; nephew of Archbishop William Thompson; brother of Kathleen Scott (and brother-in-law of Robert Falcon Scott); and father of Verily Anderson.

He was educated at St Edward's School, Oxford and Worcester College, Oxford. During his years at Oxford he stood for the presidency of the Union but was beaten by Hilaire Belloc, instead becoming secretary. He was ordained deacon in 1897, and priest in 1898. After curacies in Dinting Vale and Soho he was Rector of Clifton with Glapton from 1904 to 1912; a Chaplain to the Forces; the incumbent at St Augustine, Edgbaston, from 1912 to 1923, and lived at the vicarage at 4 Manor Road, the next-door neighbour of Sir Gilbert Barling, and finally of All Saints' Herstmonceux. He was also Grand Chaplain of the United Grand Lodge of England. A vigorous campaigner for many causes, especially against cruelty to animals: he was himself a renowned breeder of Smooth Fox Terriers.

Writings
Bruce's writings include Oxford Verses (1896), Men and Women of Soho (1900), The Common Hope ( 1904), The Clifton Book (1906), Prayers for Daily Use (1913) God and the Allies (1925), Sussex Sacred Song (1927) and Herstmonceux Church (1951).

References

1871 births
1956 deaths
20th-century English Anglican priests
People educated at St Edward's School, Oxford
Alumni of Worcester College, Oxford
English naturalists
Dog trainers
British military chaplains
Freemasons of the United Grand Lodge of England
People from Herstmonceux